This is a list of the power supply systems that are, or have been, used for railway electrification.

Note that the voltages are nominal and vary depending on load and distance from the substation.

Many modern trams and trains use on-board solid-state electronics to convert these supplies to run three-phase AC traction motors.

Tram electrification systems are listed here.

Key to the tables below
 Volts: voltage or volt
 Current:
 DC = direct current
 # Hz = frequency in hertz (alternating current (AC))
 AC supplies are usually single-phase (1Ø) except where marked three-phase (3Ø).
 Conductors:
 overhead line or
 conductor rail, usually a third rail to one side of the running rails. Conductor rail can be:
 top contact: oldest, least safe, most affected by ice, snow, rain and leaves. Protection boards are installed on most top contact systems, which increases safety and reduces these affections.
 side contact: newer, safer, less affected by ice, snow, rain and leaves
 bottom contact: newest, safest, least affected by ice, snow, rain and leaves

Systems using standard voltages

Voltages are defined by two standards: BS EN 50163 and IEC 60850.

Overhead systems

600 V DC

750 V DC

1,200 V DC

1,500 V DC

3 kV DC

AC,  Hz /

AC,

AC,

Conductor rail systems

600 V DC conductor
All systems are third rail unless stated otherwise. Used by some older metros.

750 V DC conductor

Conductor rail systems have been separated into tables based on whether they are top, side or bottom contact. Used by most metros outside Asia and the former Eastern bloc.

Bottom contact

Side contact

Top contact

Mixed

1,200 V DC conductor
All systems are third rail and side contact unless stated otherwise.

1,500 V DC conductor
All systems are third rail unless stated otherwise.

Systems using non-standard voltages

Overhead systems

DC voltage

AC voltage

Three-phase AC voltage

Two wires

Three wires

Conductor rail systems (DC voltage)
Conductor rail systems have been separated into tables based on whether they are top, side or bottom contact.

Top contact systems

Side contact systems 
All third rail unless otherwise stated.

Bottom contact systems 
All third rail unless otherwise stated.

Conductor rail systems (AC voltage)

Special or unusual types

DC, plough collection from conductors in conduit below track

 London County Council Tramways, later operated by London Transport
 streetcars in New York City (Manhattan), New York
 Washington, D.C. streetcars
 Panama Canal locks' ship handlers (called mules)

DC, one ground-level conductor
 Wolverhampton Corporation Tramways, England (stud contact) (1902–1921)
 Bordeaux Tramway, France (conductor rail)
 Sydney Light Rail (tramway)

DC, two-wire
 Greenwich, England. Previously used by trams when in the vicinity of Greenwich Observatory; separate from trolleybus supply.
 Cincinnati, Ohio, US. Tram (streetcar) system used this arrangement throughout, probably due to legal constraints on ground return currents.
 Havana and Guanabacoa, Cuba. Tram (streetcar) systems in both cities used this arrangement.
 Lisbon, Portugal. Elevador da Bica, Elevador da Glória and Elevador da Lavra.

DC, power from running rails
 Gross-Lichterfelde Tramway (1881–1893), 180 V
 Ungerer Tramway (1886–1895)
 transportable railways as a ride for children

DC, four-rail

See also

 Third rail
 Railway electrification system
 Railroad electrification in the United States
 Ground level power supply
 Conduit current collection
 Current collector
 Amtrak's 25 Hz traction power system
 List of tram systems by gauge and electrification
 Traction current pylon

Footnotes

References

External links 
 Electrification systems, track gauges and electrified track lengths in selected countries (in German)
 Map of European voltage systems
 Southern Electric, England—details of 3rd rail electrification

Electric rail traction
Rail
Electric rail transport